HD 37756 is a binary star system in the equatorial constellation of Orion, positioned less than a degree to the north of the bright star Alnitak. It has a blue-white hue and is faintly visible to the naked eye with an apparent visual magnitude of 4.95. The system is located at a distance of approximately 900 light years from the Sun based on parallax, and is drifting further away with a radial velocity of +26 km/s. It is a member of the OB1b subgroup of the Orion OB1 association.

The binary nature of this system was identified by E. B. Frost in 1904. It is a double-lined spectroscopic binary with an orbital period of 27.15 days and a high eccentricity of 0.74. The spectrum matches a massive B-type main-sequence star with a stellar classification of B3V. The secondary is luminous enough to interfere with measurements of the primary spectrum. It is a suspected Cepheid variable with a period of 0.37968 days and an amplitude of 0.03 magnitude in the B band of the UBV photometric system. The system is a candidate eclipsing binary with a minimum dip of 0.04 in visual magnitude during each orbit.

References

B-type main-sequence stars
B-type subgiants
Binary stars
Suspected variables
Cepheid variables
Eclipsing binaries

Orion (constellation)
BD-01 1004
037756
026736
1952